Pinckney Community Schools is a school district in Pinckney, Livingston County, Michigan.  The district serves 2,977 students from the communities of Hamburg Township, Putnam Township, the Village of Pinckney, and Hell. In 2010, a bond was passed with the money going towards facility improvements, classroom technology, a one-to-one laptop program for grades 7-12, a new fine and performing arts center, and a football stadium.
Beginning with the 2013-2014 school year, Navigator School serves students in grades 4, 5 and 6, while the elementary schools serve students from Pre-Kindergarten through grade 3.

Schools

The school district is housed in five buildings:
 Pinckney Community High School - grades 9 through 12
 * April Woods, Principal
 * Julia McBride, Principal
 * Dr. Jim Darga, Director of CTE Programs and Secondary Curriculum
 Pinckney New Technology High School - grades 10 through 12 (housed inside Pinckney Community High School)
 * Julia McBride, New Tech Director
 Pathfinder School - 7th and 8th grade
 * Lori Sandula, Principal
 Navigator Upper Elementary School - 4th, 5th and 6th grade
 * Janet McDole, Principal
 Farley Hill Elementary - Pre-K through 3rd grade
 * Yvonne Taylor, Principal
 Country Elementary - Pre-K through 3rd grade
 * Ruth Badalucco, Principal

External links
Pinckney Community Schools

References

 Detroit News, January 5, 2009.
 Livingston County Press & Argus, October 10, 2014, New Tech High National Recognition

School districts in Michigan
Education in Livingston County, Michigan